Red Week may refer to:

 Red Week (Chile),  week of riots in Santiago that evolved from a protest on meat tariffs
 Red Week (Italy), a week of labor riots that occurred June 1914 in Italy
 Red Week (Netherlands), an unsuccessful revolution that occurred November 1918 in the Netherlands